1954 Meistaradeildin was the twelfth season of Meistaradeildin, the top tier of the Faroese football league system. The championship was contested in a league format, with four teams playing against each other twice. KÍ Klaksvík won its fourth league title in the season.

Teams

Since there was no second-tier league, all the teams that participated in the 1953 Meistaradeildin could participate in the league. Two teams from Tórshavn, HB and B36, KI from Klaksvík and TB from Tvøroyri contested in the league.

League table

Results

External links
Faroe Islands League Final Tables by webalice.it
Faroese champions by RSSSF

Meistaradeildin seasons
Faroe
Faroe